Peter Folco (born August 13, 1953) is a Canadian former professional ice hockey player who played for the Vancouver Canucks of the National Hockey League and the Toronto Toros and Birmingham Bulls of the World Hockey Association between 1974 and 1977.

Folco was born in Montreal, Quebec. As a youth, he played in the 1966 Quebec International Pee-Wee Hockey Tournament with a minor ice hockey team from Verdun, Quebec.

Career statistics

Regular season and playoffs

References

External links
 

1953 births
Living people
Beauce Jaros players
Birmingham Bulls players
Canadian ice hockey defencemen
Philadelphia Firebirds (NAHL) players
Quebec Remparts players
Seattle Totems (CHL) players
Seattle Totems (WHL) players
Ice hockey people from Montreal
Toronto Toros players
Vancouver Canucks draft picks
Vancouver Canucks players
Verdun Maple Leafs (ice hockey) players